Qinar-e Olya (also Romanized as Qīnar-e ‘Olyā; also known as Qīz-e Bālā) is a village in Sokmanabad Rural District, Safayyeh District, Khoy County, West Azerbaijan Province, Iran. At the 2006 census, its population was 184, in 30 families.

References 

Populated places in Khoy County